Înfrăţirea may refer to several villages in Romania:

 Înfrăţirea, a village in Dor Mărunt Commune, Călăraşi County
 Înfrăţirea, a village in Bulzești Commune, Dolj County

See also 
 Frăția (disambiguation)